The 1861 Melbourne Cup was a two-mile handicap horse race which took place on Thursday, 7 November 1861.

This year was the first running of the Melbourne Cup. Fifty-seven horses were nominated and there were 21 acceptances. Four were scratched on race day, leaving 17 starters.

This is the list of placegetters for the 1861 Melbourne Cup.

The remaining runners were as follows (given in approximate finishing order where not known).

See also

 Melbourne Cup
 List of Melbourne Cup winners
 Victoria Racing Club

References

External links
1861 Melbourne Cup footyjumpers.com

1861
Melbourne Cup
Melbourne Cup
19th century in Melbourne
1860s in Melbourne